Two ships in the United States Navy have been named USS Stevens. The first was named in honor of Captain Thomas Holdup Stevens (1795–1841), and the second for both Capt. Stevens and his son, Rear Admiral Thomas H. Stevens, Jr. (1819–1896).

See also
, an  guided missile destroyer, ordered in 2018 and named for United States Senator Ted Stevens.

United States Navy ship names